Multiple Honda motorcycles have had the moniker Honda Hornet:

 Honda CB250F, sold exclusively in Japan
 Honda CB600F, sold as 599 in USA, Hornet in Europe and Brazil
 Honda CB900F (second generation), sold as 919 in USA, Hornet 900 in Europe